The City Tower (in Slovak Mestská veža) is one of the most important historic monuments of Trnava, Slovakia.

The tower's construction began on 28 July 1574. In 1666 and 1683 the tower was affected by fire and since then it has remained without a roof.

The tower has a square ground plan in the shape of a solid prism with eight floors and is 57 metres high. The tower has a scenic gallery 29 metres above ground level. The corners and the highest floor are decorated with diamond sgraffito. On the south-west side is a sundial. In the alcove above the entrance is circular relief a symbol of Christ.

On the top of the tower was originally a moon with a star emblem. This symbol was replaced by a statue of the Virgin Mary sometimes between 1739–1742, but since that time it was toppled by windstorm and replaced by a life-size gilt copper statue.

In 1729 a clockwork mechanism from Franz Langer's workshop was added to the fifth floor. The bobs weigh 300 kilograms and hang on a 30-metre rope.

In 1818 a new entrance into the tower was built above which was sgraffiti of Christ and the Latin lettering: Nisi dominus custodierit civitatem, frustra vigilat, gui custodit eam ("except the Lord keep the city, the watchman waketh but in vain", Psalm 127).

The tower was reconstructed in 1938–1941 by the Pittel and Brausvetter company. The sgraffiti were covered by plaster and the statue was re-gilded in the workshop of Peter Michaletz.

Another reconstruction took place in 1997–1998.

Buildings and structures in Trnava
Towers in Slovakia
16th-century architecture in Slovakia